Amândio Ramiro Barreiras (born 11 February 1952) is a Portuguese football manager and a former player.

He played 15 seasons and 305 games in the Primeira Liga for Boavista, Sporting Espinho, Vitória de Guimarães, União de Leiria, Chaves and Sporting.

Club career
He made his Primeira Liga debut for Boavista on 12 September 1971 in a game against Sporting.

Honors

Boavista
Taça de Portugal winner: 1974–1975, 1978–79.

References

External links

1952 births
Sportspeople from Bragança District
Living people
Portuguese footballers
G.D. Chaves players
Liga Portugal 2 players
Boavista F.C. players
Primeira Liga players
Sporting CP footballers
S.C. Espinho players
U.D. Leiria players
Vitória S.C. players
Portuguese football managers
Primeira Liga managers
Leixões S.C. managers
U.D. Leiria managers
C.D. Feirense managers
União Montemor players
U.S.C. Paredes managers
Boavista F.C. managers
Association football defenders